Kusharjanto is an Indonesian surname. Notable people with the surname include: 

Rehan Naufal Kusharjanto (born 2000), Indonesian badminton player
Tri Kusharjanto (born 1974), Indonesian badminton player

Indonesian-language surnames